Acacia macraneura, commonly known as big mac wattle, is a shrub belonging to the genus Acacia and the subgenus Juliflorae that is native to arid parts of western Australia.

Description
The slightly hairy branchlets often have obscure resinous ribbing near the extremities. Like most species of Acacia it has phyllodes rather than true leaves. The green to grey-green phyllodes have a blueish coloured tinge and are incurved or sigmoid to sinuous.

Distribution
It is endemic to the Mid West and Pilbara regions of Western Australia. It has a scattered distribution from around Mount Magnet in the south west to around Leonora in the south east to the Pilbara region and around the Rudall River catchment and the Little Sandy Desert with smaller populations close to the border with South Australia.

See also
List of Acacia species

References

macraneura
Acacias of Western Australia
Plants described in 2012
Taxa named by Bruce Maslin